Netherlands Telugu Community (NLTC) is a non-profit organisation founded in The Netherlands.

During the Covid-19 lockdown NLTC actively connected people with the Indian Embassy and requested the Indian government to arrange a flight from Amsterdam to Hyderabad.

Cultural events
NLTC organizes various cultural events for the community.

Community work
NLTC actively participates in charity related activities in the Netherlands and India. Every year NLTC organizes a charity run to collect funds to support KWF in fighting cancer. NLTC also works with other local organizations in the Netherlands in charity related activities.

References

External links 

 

Indian expatriates in the Netherlands
International Telugu Associations